A Japanese rebus monogram is a monogram in a particular style, which spells a name via a rebus, as a form of Japanese wordplay or visual pun. Today they are most often seen in corporate logos or product logos.

These symbols are particularly common for traditional food brands, notably soy sauce. An example is the logo for Yamasa soy sauce, which is a ∧ with a  under it.

Composition
The monogram is composed of two parts: one a Japanese character, most often kanji, but also katakana or hiragana; the other a simple symbol, such as a circle or square. The symbol is pronounced according to its name, and together (in either order, but generally symbol first) these form a Japanese name.

Japanese family names are generally two kanji characters, each usually of one or two morae – hence one or two hiragana or katakana if written that way – and thus can be represented as one symbol plus one kanji character, sometimes one hiragana or katakana. Only a few symbols are used, and thus only a few names can be written as a monogram this way.

A name may be represented by a symbol that does not correspond to it but is homophonous – further punning – which is aided by the large degree of homophony in Japanese.

Variations
There are many variations on the basic design of rebus monograms – only one character from the name may be used, the pronunciation need not correspond to an actual name, other typographical symbols can be used (like 〆), two symbols (and no characters) may be used – for example,  can be spelt as ○∧ – and unpronounceable or unpronounced symbols may also be incorporated decoratively.

These readings are used for other symbols as well. This is notably present in the movie title .

Rarer variants exist, like  for Kikkoman soy sauce (tortoises are said to live for 10,000 years), which uses a hexagon to symbolize a tortoise shell, with  inside.

Common symbols
Only a handful of symbols are commonly used, though some have different readings; these are:

Terminology
There is no standard everyday Japanese term for rebus monograms.

History
They presumably come from the graphic tradition of the battlefield flags of the Warring States Period (Sengoku period, mid-15th to early 17th century), as seen in the simple clan name designs of Sashimono and Uma-jirushi.

Gallery

See also
 
 Canting arms, the Western equivalent for coat of arms

Notes

References

Monograms
Japanese heraldry
Japanese language